Lady bugs (Coccinellidae) are a widespread family of small beetle.

Lady Bug or Ladybug may also refer to:

 Lady Bug (Koons), a 2014 augmented reality sculpture by Jeff Koons
 Ladybug (magazine), an illustrated literary magazine for children
 "Ladybug" (The Presidents of the United States of America song), 2008
 Lady Bug (video game), 1981
 FL Lady Bug, an American Quarter Horse mare
 Ladybugs, a female Beatlesque band in the television comedy series Petticoat Junction
 Ladybugs (film), a 1992 film starring Rodney Dangerfield 
 The Ladybugs, an American jazz band
 "Lady Bug", a song by Breaking Benjamin on the 2004 EP, So Cold
 Ladybug, a character from the French television series Miraculous: Tales of Ladybug & Cat Noir
 Ladybug Mecca, a member of the rap group Digable Planets

See also
 Ladybug Ladybug (film)
 Ladybird (disambiguation)